Gerald Barry may refer to:

Gerald Barry (British journalist) (1898–1968), British newspaper editor and organizer of the Festival of Britain
Gerald Barry (Irish journalist) (1947–2011), Irish political journalist and broadcaster
Gerald Barry (British Army officer) (1896–1977), British soldier and cricketer
Gerald Barry (composer) (born 1952), Irish composer
Gerald Barry (actor), British stage and film actor
Gerat Barry or Gerald Barry  ( 1624–1642), colonel in the Spanish army and military writer

See also
Gerald de Barry ( 1146–c. 1223), clergyman and chronicler